Maria Jasin (born 1956) is a molecular biologist at Memorial Sloan Kettering Cancer Center. Her lab studies homologous recombination, a method in which breaks in DNA strands are repaired. She is an elected member of the National Academy of Sciences and the American Academy of Arts and Sciences.

Career
Jasin received her PhD in 1984 from the Massachusetts Institute of Technology in the group of Paul Schimmel, and did postdoctoral research at the University of Zürich and Stanford University.

Jasin is a scientist in the department of developmental biology at Memorial Sloan Kettering Cancer Center. She is also a professor at the Weill Cornell Graduate School of Medical Sciences. Her research has been supported by the Breast Cancer Research Foundation since 2017.

Jasin was elected to the National Academy of Sciences in 2015 and the American Academy of Arts and Sciences in 2017. She was awarded the Basser Global Prize in 2018  and the Shaw Prize in Life Sciences in 2019.

Jasin was elected to the American Philosophical Society in 2022.

References

External links 
 CSHL: A Conversation with Maria Jasin

Memorial Sloan Kettering Cancer Center faculty
21st-century American biologists
American expatriates in Switzerland
Members of the United States National Academy of Sciences
21st-century American women scientists
Massachusetts Institute of Technology alumni
University of Zurich alumni
Stanford University alumni
Fellows of the American Academy of Arts and Sciences
Living people
Weill Medical College of Cornell University faculty
1956 births
American women academics
Members of the American Philosophical Society
Members of the National Academy of Medicine